Werner Jakobus Visser (born 27 February 1998) is a South African male discus thrower, who won a gold medal at the 2015 World Youth Championships in Cali. At senior level, he won his first medal, a silver, at the 2018 African Championships in Asaba.

Achievements
All information taken from World Athletics profile.

International competitions

National titles
  Championships
 Discus throw: 2018, 2019, 2022

 South African U20 Championships
 Discus throw: 2017

References

External links

1998 births
Living people
South African male discus throwers
African Championships in Athletics winners
South African Athletics Championships winners
World Youth Championships in Athletics winners